Piazorhinus is a genus of true weevils in the beetle family Curculionidae. There are about eight described species in Piazorhinus.

Species
These eight species belong to the genus Piazorhinus:
 Piazorhinus guyanensis (Hustache, 1939)
 Piazorhinus leucopectoralis Voss, 1934
 Piazorhinus myops Fåhraeus, 1843
 Piazorhinus pictus LeConte, 1876
 Piazorhinus scutellaris (Say, 1826)
 Piazorhinus thoracicus (Casey, 1910)
 Piazorhinus tuberculatus Blatchley, 1916
 Piazorhinus unicolor Voss, 1934

References

Further reading

 
 
 

Curculioninae
Articles created by Qbugbot